The Shah Nematollah Vali Shrine is a historical complex, located in Mahan, Iran, which contains the mausoleum of Shah Nematollah Vali, the renowned Iranian mystic and poet. Shah Nematollah Vali died in 1431 aged over 100. In 1436 a shrine was erected in his honor and became a pilgrimage site; with the attention of successive rulers contributing various additions over the centuries.

History and design 

The shrine complex comprises four courtyards, a reflecting pool, a mosque and twin minarets covered with turquoise tiles from the bottom up to the cupola. The earliest construction is attributed to the Bahmanid ruler Ahmed I Vali who erected the sanctuary chamber in 1436. Shah Abbas I undertook extensions and renovations in 1601, including reconstruction of the tiled blue dome, described as "one of the most magnificent architectural masterpieces in old Persia". During the Qajar period the site was particularly popular, necessitating the construction of additional courtyards to accommodate increased numbers of pilgrims. The minarets also date from this period. The small room where Nematollah Vali prayed and meditated contains plasterwork and tile decorations. The complex is also famous for its tilework and seven ancient wooden doors.

The blue girih tiled dome contains stars with, from the top, 5, 7, 9, 12, 11, 9 and 10 points in turn. 11-point stars are rare in the geometric patterns of Islamic art.

Architecture 

The complex includes some courtyards and other sections which are as follows when one moves from the street toward the interior of the mosque: Atabaki courtyard, Vakil-ol-Molki courtyard, Modir-ol-Molki portico, the shrine, Shah Abbasi portico, Mirdamad courtyard and Hosseiniyeh courtyard.

Atabaki courtyard 
Atabaki courtyard has been built through contributions from Ali Asghar Khan Atabak, the chancellor of Naser al-Din Shah and has porticos around and a big pond in the middle.

Vakil-ol-Molki courtyard 
Vakil-ol-Molki courtyard has been built by Mohammad Esmaeil Ebrahim Khan Nouri, Vakil-ol-Molk. On the upper part of the entrance corridor is Shah Nematollah Museum while a bookshop is located to the north and the tombs of Amir Nezam Garousi, the famous politicians, literary experts, artist and renowned figure of Qajar area are located to the southwest. There is a polygonal pond in the middle of the courtyard, which is usually adorned with geraniums. After Mohammad Esmaeil Khan died, his son, Morteza Qoli Khan, added two minarets and a portico to the complex.

Shrine (mausoleum) 

It has a dome-shaped arch which is adorned with paintings and has two shells. In the middle of the arch, there is a Zarih which is 3.4 m long and 2 m wide. On the marble stone which is the last covering of the tomb, there is a Quranic verse around which the names of 12 Shia Imams have been written.

Chelleh Khaneh (40 Nights House) 
On the southwestern side of the portico behind the shrine, there is a small place where Shah Nematollah Vali spent 40 days and nights worshipping God. Its roof is like the hat worn by Sufis and has 12 cracks in it. Some verses of the Quran and Persian poems have been written on the walls. Chelleh Khaneh was totally damaged during a flood in 1932, but was reconstructed later.

Shah Abbasi Portico 
The portico has been built in 998 AH under the rule of Shah Abbas I and when Beik Tash Khan was the ruler of Kerman. The names of 12 Shiite imams have been written at the entrance of the portico in relief inscription.

Mirdamad Courtyard 
This courtyard which is also known as Shah Abbasi courtyard has been reconstructed under the rule of Naser al-Din Shah of Qajar dynasty.

Hosseiniyeh Courtyard 
This is the last courtyard of Shah Nematollah Vali complex which contains the Mohammad Shahi minarets standing on the western side of it. The minarets are 42 m high and were built under the rule of Mohammad Shah Qajar. They were damaged in an earthquake in 1981. This courtyard is connected to Biglarbeigi House by a bridge, which is currently known as Motevalli Bashi House and is a hostel. The bridge was destroyed in a flood in 1932. Other parts of the shrine include the library and Shah Vali Museum where valuable copies of the Quran, one of which is attributed to Bibi Khatoun and is called Si-Pareh (30 pieces), various types of armors and swords and a unique piece of cloth which once covered the tomb are being kept. The fabric is among artistic handicrafts of Kerman province, which is called Pateh and was built under Naser al-Din Shah for four years by tens of Kermani artists.

Image Gallery

See also
 Iranian architecture
 Shah Nematollah Vali
 Sufism

References

Sources

External links
High-resolution 360° Panorama of the Shah Nematollah Vali Shrine | Art Atlas

Religious buildings and structures completed in 1436
Architecture in Iran
Tourist attractions in Kerman Province
Buildings and structures in Kerman Province
Pilgrimage sites